Gray County (county code GY) is a county located in the U.S. state of Kansas. As of the 2020 census, the county population was 5,653. Its county seat and most populous city is Cimarron.

History 
Gray County was founded in 1881 and named for Alfred Gray. Between 1887 and 1893, a county seat war took place in Gray County that involved several notable Old West figures, such as Bat Masterson, Bill Tilghman, and Ben Daniels. As a result of the dispute, Cimarron became the permanent county seat of Gray County.

Geography 

Since 2001, NextEra Energy Resources has operated the largest wind farm in Kansas—170 turbines with a generating capacity of 110 megawatts—on a  site near Montezuma.

Adjacent counties 
 Finney County (north)
 Hodgeman County (northeast)
 Ford County (east)
 Meade County (south)
 Haskell County (west)

Demographics 

As of the 2000 census, there were 5,904 people, 2,045 households, and 1,556 families residing in the county. The population density was 7 people per square mile (3/km2). There were 2,181 housing units at an average density of 2 per square mile (1/km2). The racial makeup of the county was 92.31% White, 0.46% Native American, 0.19% Black or African American, 0.10% Asian, 0.07% Pacific Islander, 5.42% from other races, and 1.46% from two or more races. Hispanic or Latino of any race were 9.81% of the population.

There were 2,045 households, out of which 42.00% had children under the age of 18 living with them, 67.70% were married couples living together, 5.60% had a female householder with no husband present, and 23.90% were non-families. 21.20% of all households were made up of individuals, and 9.40% had someone living alone who was 65 years of age or older. The average household size was 2.82 and the average family size was 3.31.

In the county, the population was spread out, with 31.60% under the age of 18, 8.30% from 18 to 24, 27.30% from 25 to 44, 20.20% from 45 to 64, and 12.70% who were 65 years of age or older. The median age was 33 years. For every 100 females there were 100.10 males. For every 100 females age 18 and over, there were 96.20 males.

The median income for a household in the county was $40,000, and the median income for a family was $45,299. Males had a median income of $31,519 versus $21,563 for females. The per capita income for the county was $18,632. About 6.50% of families and 9.10% of the population were below the poverty line, including 11.80% of those under age 18 and 8.00% of those age 65 or over.

Religion 
Gray County has by far the highest percentage of adherents of the Church of God in Christ, Mennonite in the US. There were 1,032 members of the Church in Gray County in 2010, which is 17.18% of the population. It is the largest Church in the county.

Government

Presidential elections 
Gray county is often carried easily by Republican candidates. The last time a Democratic candidate carried this county was in 1976 by Jimmy Carter.

Laws 
Although the Kansas Constitution was amended in 1986 to allow the sale of alcoholic liquor by the individual drink with the approval of voters, Gray County has remained a prohibition, or "dry", county.

Education

Unified school districts 
 Cimarron–Ensign USD 102
 Montezuma USD 371
 Copeland USD 476
 Ingalls USD 477

Communities

Cities and Towns 
 Cimarron (county seat)
 Copeland
 Ensign
 Ingalls
 Montezuma

Unincorporated communities 
 Charleston
 Haggard

Townships 
Gray County is divided into seven townships.  None of the cities within the county are considered governmentally independent, and all figures for the townships include those of the cities.  In the following table, the population center is the largest city (or cities) included in that township's population total, if it is of a significant size.

See also 
 Dry counties

References

Further reading

External links 

County
 
 Gray County – Directory of Public Officials
Other
 Gray County Wind Farm, largest wind farm in Kansas
Maps
 Gray County Maps: Current, Historic, KDOT
 Kansas Highway Maps: Current, Historic, KDOT
 Kansas Railroad Maps: Current, 1996, 1915, KDOT and Kansas Historical Society

 
Kansas counties
1881 establishments in Kansas
Populated places established in 1881